Sinojackia rehderiana (狭果秤锤树, xia guo cheng chui shu) is a species of flowering plant in the genus Sinojackia.

Endemic range
Populations are found in northern Guangdong, southern Hunan, and Jiangxi provinces.

Description

The species is cultivated as an ornamental plant for landscape design use in gardens.

References

rehderiana
Endemic flora of China
Garden plants of Asia